"I'm Falling" is a song by Scottish band the Bluebells, from their debut album Sisters. Released as a single in 1984, it became their first top 20 hit, peaking at No. 11 on the UK Singles Chart and spending a total of 15 weeks on the chart.

Charts

References

1984 songs
1984 singles
The Bluebells songs
London Records singles
Sire Records singles